Scopula anoista is a moth of the family Geometridae. It was described by Prout in 1915. It is found in Cameroon, Equatorial Guinea and Ivory Coast.

References

Moths described in 1915
anoista
Moths of Africa
Taxa named by Louis Beethoven Prout